Domenico Antonio Lo Faso Pietrasanta (October 21, 1783, Palermo, Kingdom of Sicily – February 15, 1863, Florence, Kingdom of Italy) was an Italian architect, archaeologist, and writer.

Biography
Scholar, architect, student of archeology and architecture (mostly in Sicily), Domenico Antonio Lo Faso Pietrasanta Duke of Serradifalco, wrote several works on ancient and medieval Sicilian monuments.

He was born in Palermo during the Reign of Ferdinand III King of Sicily, to the noble House of Lo Faso, which acquired the barony and comune of Serradifalco in 1752.  The first Lo Faso baron was made a Duke in 1664, and the barony became the Duchy of Serradifalco.  Domenico Antonio married Enrichetta Ventimiglia on 30 December 1819.  He inherited the Duchy and was invested as the Fifth Duke of Serradifalco on 8 December 1809.  An avid student of Sicilian history, he studied architecture and archeology in Milan. He was elected a Foreign Honorary Member of the American Academy of Arts and Sciences in 1838. During the Revolution of 1848 he was Speaker of the House of Peers of the Parliament of the independent nation of Sicily and the country's Foreign Minister.

After the return of the Bourbons he was forced into exile in Florence. After the capture of the island by Garibaldi, he returned to Sicily.  He was appointed President of the Commission of Antiquities and Fine Art and was called by the Senate of Savoy Kingdom of Italy. He directed excavations and restorations in the major archaeological sites in Sicily: Segesta, Selinus, Agrigento, Syracuse, Taormina and published reports for all, containing detailed tables with reliefs and paintings of high quality and still useful today.  He was known throughout the field of archeology, and was called simply Serradifalco.

His portrait is preserved in the Biblioteca Comunale di Palermo (Public Library of Palermo).

In the church of San Domenico in Palermo, a monument is dedicated to him, bearing the inscription: 
Domenico Lo Faso Pietrasanta Duke of Serradifalco
promoted Sicilian arts and letters with his mind and his inheritance

Principal projects in Palermo
 The Palace in the Royal Bourbon Forum (today Palermo's Foro Italico);
 The plans for the Finance Building;
 The Theatre of Music in the Bourbon Forum, in collaboration with Carlo Giachery, 1844

Bibliography
Description of an Antique Clay Vase, Palermo 1830
Overview of the Ruins of Ancient Soluto, Palermo 1831
The Antiquities of Sicily Described and Illustrated, Palermo 1834-42 
On the Cathedral of Monreale and Other Siculo-Norman Churches: Three arguments, Palermo 1838
On the Relic "Heart of San Luigi": memoir of Domenico Lo Faso Pietrasanta, Palermo 1843
The Ancient Monuments of Sicily in Pictorial Views Designed by the Duke of Serradifalco, Palermo 1843
On Gothic Architecture, 1847

References

Giovanni Fatta, Maria Clara Ruggieri Tricoli, Un rinnovamento sulla base della natura: Serradifalco e l’unità dello stile, Cavallari e il connubio di tecnica ed arte, in Palermo nell’Età del Ferro, Palermo 1983, pp. 88–92
Giuseppe Testa, "Serradifalco", Serradifalco 1990
Ettore Sessa, Domenico Lo Faso Pietrasanta, Duca di Serradifalco: ricerca del nuovo sistema di architettura e insegnamento privato, in G.B.F. Basile, Lezioni di architettura, a cura di Maria Giuffrè, G. Guerrera, Palermo 1995, pp. 269–277
Gabriella Cianciolo Cosentino, Serradifalco e la Germania. La Stildiskussion tra Sicilia e Baviera 1823-1850, Benevento 2004
Gabriella Cianciolo Cosentino, Un manoscritto sull'architettura gotica del Duca di Serradifalco (1847), in "Lexicon. Storie e architettura in Sicilia" n. 2, 2006, pp. 80–87

External links
 Partial translation of Giuseppe Testa's Serradifalco

1783 births
1863 deaths
Architects from Palermo
Fellows of the American Academy of Arts and Sciences
19th-century Italian architects
Archaeologists from Palermo